Qingliang Shan may refer to:
 Mount Wutai in Shanxi Province, China
 Qingliangshan Park in Nanjing, China